Chorizanthe parryi is a species of flowering plant in the buckwheat family known by the common name Parry's spineflower and San Bernardino spineflower.

The plant is endemic to Southern California, where it is found in the San Bernardino Mountains, San Gabriel Mountains and Western Transverse Ranges, the Colorado Desert, and along the southern coast. It is found mainly in chaparral scrub plant communities.

Description
Chorizanthe parryi is a small, sprawling herb with roughly hairy stems spreading along the ground or somewhat upright. There are a few leaves up to four centimeters long located mainly around the base of the stems where they emerge from the ground.

The flowers have urn-shaped bases of woolly bracts whose points may be straight or hooked, the characteristic which differentiates the two varieties. The tiny flower is white and sometimes hairy.

Varieties
Chorizanthe parryi var. fernandina — San Fernando Valley spineflower,  endemic to Southern California and formerly known in 10 locations in the foothills around the San Fernando Valley and ranges in Los Angeles, Orange, and Ventura counties.  Those were lost to development, and botanists thought the species was extinct from 1929 until it was discovered in 1999. It is now only known from 2 populations: on Laskey Mesa in Upper Las Virgenes Canyon Open Space Preserve of the Simi Hills in Ventura County; and on the proposed Newhall Ranch mega−development site in the Santa Clara River Valley at the base of the northern Santa Susana Mountains in Los Angeles County.  It is a state California Department of Fish and Wildlife and California Native Plant Society listed Critically endangered species.
Chorizanthe parryi var. parryi — Parry's spineflower,  San Bernardino spineflower.

References

External links

Jepson Manual Treatment: Chorizanthe parryi

parryi
Endemic flora of California
Flora of the California desert regions
Flora of the Sonoran Deserts
Natural history of the California chaparral and woodlands
Natural history of the Colorado Desert
Natural history of the Santa Monica Mountains
Natural history of the Transverse Ranges
~
~
~
~
Taxa named by Sereno Watson